Tweed Regional Gallery & Margaret Olley Art Centre is a regional art gallery in Murwillumbah, New South Wales, Australia. Lonely Planet Australia describes it as "an exceptional gallery... home to some of Australia's finest in a variety of media."

In June 2009 the gallery featured in an episode of the ABC television program, Collectors.

On 15 March 2014 the gallery opened a new Margaret Olley Art Centre, which cost $4 million to construct. Funding included $1 million from the federal government's Community Infrastructure Grants Program. The new Centre houses the 76,000 objects from the studio of artist Margaret Olley, who died in 2011 aged 88.

References

External links

Art museums and galleries in New South Wales